Zengdu is a district of the city of Suizhou, Hubei province, People's Republic of China.

Administrative divisions
Four subdistricts:
Xicheng Subdistrict, Dongcheng Subdistrict, Nanjiao Subdistrict, Beijiao Subdistrict

Five towns:
Wandian, Hedian, Luoyang, Fuhe, Xihe

Other areas:
Chengnan New Area, Zengdu District New Industry Base, Suizhou City Economic Development Zone, Suizhou Tiedong New Area, Zengdu District Economic Development Zone

References

County-level divisions of Hubei
Suizhou